Mock duck is a gluten-based meat substitute. It is made of wheat gluten, oil, sugar, soy sauce, and salt, and is high in protein. Its distinctive flavor and artificial "plucked duck" texture distinguish it from other forms of commercially available gluten products. Mock duck is not meant to be eaten raw and needs to be prepared, usually by lightly frying in vegetable oil. 

Mock duck along with other wheat gluten meat substitutes has origins in the Chinese Buddhist cuisine, dating back to the middle ages. Mock duck can be found in some Chinese grocery stores or retail outlets providing international selections of food. It is most often sold canned. Similar products may be labeled as "Mock Abalone" or "Cha'i Pow Yu" (齋鮑魚; pinyin: zhāibàoyú).

Typically, mock duck gains its flavor from the stewing of the gluten product in soy sauce and MSG.

A variation of mock duck made from tofu skin is also popular, and is known as tofu duck.

See also

 List of meat substitutes

References

Meat substitutes
Buddhist cuisine